Dos Mares, is the second official single from Operación Triunfo 2006: Adelante album. The single was released in Spain January 2007.

The song was written and composed by Mayte, Mercedes and Moritz, contestants of the 5th series of Operación Triunfo

Charts

References                 

Spanish-language songs
2006 songs